Captain Poison may refer to:
 Captain Poison (1943 film), an Argentine historical comedy drama film
 Captain Poison (1951 film), a Spanish historical comedy film
 Captain Poison, a novel by Pedro Antonio de Alarcón